Suntree is an unincorporated community in Brevard County, Florida, United States.  It is located near the center of the county, off I-95 near Viera between Interstate 95 and the Florida East Coast Railroad.  It lies approximately halfway between Rockledge and Melbourne.

Suntree is part of the Palm Bay–Melbourne–Titusville Metropolitan Statistical Area.

Places of Interest 

 Suntree Country Club
 Interlachen Park
Brevard Zoo

Geography
Suntree is located at  While it is located north of Melbourne, it uses a Melbourne, Florida postal address.

Rare snowfall
On January 9, 2010, a storm during a cold snap brought mostly rain, but it later changed into sleet and then to snow. The snow was light, and there was no accumulation.

Media 
Viera Voice is the monthly local newspaper that serves Suntree and Rockledge/Viera. 
The Sun also a bi-weekly newspaper, serves Suntree and the surrounding areas, including Palm Shores.
Hometown News is the bi-weekly local newspaper that serves Suntree/Viera.

Notable residents 
Major General Frederick C. Blesse, the sixth ranking fighter pilot of all time. Lived in Country Walk.
Cecil Fielder and Prince Fielder 1998-2000. Father and son professional baseball players. They lived in a mansion on Jordan Blass Drive.
Richie Lewis, a retired Major League Baseball player, currently resides here with his family.

References

Unincorporated communities in Brevard County, Florida
Unincorporated communities in Florida